This is a list of lighthouses and lightvessels in Finland.

Lighthouses

See also 
 Lists of lighthouses and lightvessels

References

External links 

 

Finland

Lighthouses
Lighthouses